"Babylon" is a song by British singer-songwriter David Gray. Originally released on 12 July 1999 as the second single from his fourth album, White Ladder (1998), it was re-released as the fourth single on 19 June 2000. "Babylon" peaked at number five on the UK Singles Chart in June 2000 and received a platinum certification from the British Phonographic Industry (BPI) in January 2021. The single also charted in the United States, peaking at number 57 on the Billboard Hot 100 and number one on the Billboard Adult Alternative Songs chart.

A remix titled "Babylon II" appears exclusively on the US version of the album. The B-side "Over My Head" also appears on the Japanese pressing of the album as a bonus track. Remixes by Flightcrank were also commissioned in 2000, appearing on several promotional releases.

Music videos
Two videos were produced to accompany the song. Version one was released in 2000 and directed by Kieran Evans. It features David Gray singing directly into the camera as it pans from right to left across a number of scenes throughout the city of London at nighttime. A second, and stylistically similar, video was also released which shows Gray performing the song intercut with live concert footage and street scenes in San Francisco.

Track listings
UK CD single (1999)
 "Babylon"
 "Lead Me Upstairs" (live at the Temple Bar Music Centre, Dublin, on 16 December 1998)
 "New Horizons" (live at the Temple Bar Music Centre, Dublin, on 16 December 1998)

UK CD and cassette single (2000); Australian CD single
 "Babylon" (radio mix one)
 "Tell Me More Lies"
 "Over My Head"

European CD single
 "Babylon" (radio mix one)
 "Tell Me More Lies"

Personnel
Personnel are taken from the 2000 UK CD single liner notes and the White Ladder album booklet.
 David Gray – writing, vocals, guitar, piano, production
 Craig McClune – drums, vocals, bass, production
 Tim Bradshaw – keyboards
 Iestyn Polson – production, programming, engineering
 Phil Knott – cover photo
 Yumi Matote – design

Charts

Weekly charts

Year-end charts

Certifications

Release history

Cover versions
In 2008, Australian singer Kate Ceberano recorded a version for her album So Much Beauty.

References

1998 songs
1999 singles
David Gray (musician) songs
East West Records singles
RCA Records singles
Songs written by David Gray (musician)